Mr. DJ (born David Sheats) is an American hip-hop producer and DJ from Atlanta. He and Outkast members Big Boi and André 3000 make up the record production company Earthtone III.

Biography
Raised on the southside of College Park, Georgia, Mr. DJ attended Banneker High School. He entered the music industry as a DJ for Atlanta-based hip-hop group Outkast. According to Sheats,

After touring with the group for a year, he began to focus more on production rather than deejaying. By sharpening his beat making skills, Mr. DJ got the opportunity to help produce Outkast's 1996 second album ATLiens. Following his work on OutKast's “Elevators (Me & You)” and several songs from their album Aquemini, Mr. DJ formed Earthtone III production group with Andre 3000 & Big Boi. Collectively, the trio produced roughly 80% of tracks from Stankonia to their latest album, Idlewild. In addition, Mr. DJ continued to DJ on every OutKast album, except Speakerboxxx/The Love Below, which he mostly produced. To date, his most notable hits include "Da Art of Storytellin'", "B.O.B.", "Ms. Jackson", and "The Whole World". He is also a part of the Atlanta-based hip hop/R&B/soul musical collective The Dungeon Family.

Mr. DJ has won two Grammy Awards, one in 2002 for Best Rap Performance by a Duo or Group for "Ms. Jackson", and another in 2004 for Rap Album of the Year for his work on Outkast's Speakerboxxx/The Love Below. In 2008, he started his own record label, Camp David Records, with several new artists including Jeff B., Chinkie Brown, and Shawty Redd. Public Relations Associate Keith Kemp was quoted as saying: 

Mr. DJ recently worked with Mos Def on his album The Ecstatic, producing four tracks on Common's 2008 album, Universal Mind Control. In addition to Outkast, Mr. DJ has worked with Lenny Kravitz, Bubba Sparxxx, Goodie Mob, Killer Mike, Field Mob, Rich Boy, and 8Ball & MJG.

References

Musicians from Atlanta
Dungeon Family members
American hip hop DJs
African-American musicians
Grammy Award winners for rap music
American hip hop record producers
Living people
LaFace Records artists
Year of birth missing (living people)